Md Mozammal Haque Haque (born 20 November 1978) is a Bangladeshi kabaddi player who was part of the team that won the bronze medal at the 2006 Asian Games.

References

Living people
1978 births
Bangladeshi kabaddi players
Place of birth missing (living people)
Asian Games medalists in kabaddi
Kabaddi players at the 2006 Asian Games
Kabaddi players at the 2010 Asian Games
Asian Games bronze medalists for Bangladesh
Medalists at the 2006 Asian Games